Pun is a surname. It may be:
A surname of the Magar people in Nepal
An English surname of unexplained origin
A Cantonese spelling of the Chinese surname transcribed as Pān in Mandarin Pinyin

According to statistics cited by Patrick Hanks, there were 783 people with this surname on the island of Great Britain and six on the island of Ireland as of 2011. The 2010 United States Census found 1,197 people with the surname Pun, making it the 21,736th-most-common name in the country. This represented an increase from 861 people (26,614th-most-common) in the 2000 Census. In both censuses, more than four-fifths of the bearers of the surname identified as Asian.

Notable people with this surname include:
Tul Bahadur Pun (1923–2011), Nepali rifleman of the Royal Gurkha Rifles and recipient of the Victoria Cross
Om Prasad Pun (born 1942), Nepali boxer
Narayan Singh Pun (–2008), Nepali politician, member of the House of Representatives
Serge Pun (born 1953), Burmese businessman of Chinese descent
Mahabir Pun (born 1955), Nepali teacher and social entrepreneur
Pun Kwok-shan (born 1961), Hong Kong politician
Nanda Kishor Pun (born 1966), Nepali politician, second Vice-President of Nepal
Dipprasad Pun (born ), Nepali sergeant of the Royal Gurkha Rifles and recipient of the Conspicuous Gallantry Cross
Sagar Pun (born 1993), Nepali cricketer
Barsaman Pun, Nepali politician, former Minister of Finance

See also
Zein Pun (1295–1330), king of Martaban for one week in 1330

Notes

References

Chinese-language surnames
English-language surnames
Surnames of Nepalese origin